Austroboletus eburneus is a species of bolete fungus found in Australia. It was described as new to science in 1986. The species name eburneus is the Latin adjective "ivory-white".

References

External links

eburneus
Fungi described in 1986
Fungi native to Australia
Taxa named by Roy Watling